Andrew Setefano (born 10 August 1987) is a Samoan professional footballer who plays as a defender for Lupe o le Soaga. He has been a member of the Samoa national football team since 2011. 

Setefano is from Moamoa-fou, Satuimalufilufi and Vaito'omuli. He has played football for Upper Hutt City FC in New Zealand, Hekari United F.C. in Papua New Guinea, Goldstar Sogi FC, Vailima Kiwi FC, and Lupe o le Soaga in Samoa.

He played for Vailima Kiwi FC in the 2019 OFC Champions League, and was suspended during the opening match. He captained Lupe o le Soaga in the 2020 OFC Champions League.

Setefano was selected for a Samoan team to play against Papakura City FC in 2009. He captained the Samoa national football team in the 2012 OFC Nations Cup. In June 2019 he was named to the squad for the 2019 Pacific Games.

References 

Living people
1987 births
People from Aiga-i-le-Tai
People from Palauli
Samoan footballers
Samoa international footballers
Kiwi FC players
2012 OFC Nations Cup players
Association football defenders